is a Shintō shrine in Tokorozawa city, Saitama Prefecture, Japan. It is noteworthy as a scale reproduction of Mount Fuji that can be easily climbed and offers views of the actual Mount Fuji and surrounding areas from the top.

History 

Arahata Fuji was built in the 1880s by the local population at a time when visiting and climbing the actual Mount Fuji was out of the reach of most Japanese.

Gallery

References 

 To Mt. Harahata (Retrieved June 22, 2015)
 Tokorozawa Daily Photo Blog (Retrieved June 22, 2015)

Buildings and structures in Tokorozawa, Saitama
Shinto shrines in Saitama Prefecture